Peterson Lake may refer to:

Peterson Lake (Clearwater County, Minnesota)
Peterson Lake (Meeker County, Minnesota)
Peterson Lake, Wabasha County, Minnesota